Portage is an unincorporated village within the town of Portage Lake in Aroostook County, Maine, United States. Portage has a post office with ZIP code 04768, which opened on November 6, 1883.

References

Villages in Aroostook County, Maine
Villages in Maine